A list of the most notable films produced in Bulgaria during the 1980s grouped by year of release. For an alphabetical list of articles on Bulgarian films see :Category:Bulgarian films.

List

1980

1981

1982

1983

1984

1985

1986

1987

1988

1989

Notes

References
 
 The Internet movie database

1980s
Films
Bulgaria